The Aigeira Municipal Stadium (known to the locals as San Christo) is a sport venue in Aigeira, Greece, the home ground of FC Panegiratikos.

References

Sports venues in Greece